Plaude laetare Gallia is a motet by Jean-Baptiste Lully (music) and Pierre Perrin (text), written to celebrate the baptism of King Louis XIV's son, the Grand Dauphin Louis, on 24 March 1668 (when he was 7 years old), at the chapel of the Château de Saint-Germain-en-Laye.

Parts of Plaude laetare Gallia 
Plaude laetare Gallia contains three parts: 
 Symphonie
 O Jesu vita precantium
 Vivat regnet princeps fidelis

Text

See also 
 List of compositions by Jean-Baptiste Lully
 Jean-Baptiste Lully
 Louis, Grand Dauphin
 Motet

References  

Compositions by Jean-Baptiste Lully
Motets